Gentleman's Dub Club are a British dub band, originating from Leeds, Yorkshire.

Biography
Having built a reputation for delivering energetic live shows, the group has played for crowds from Goa to Glastonbury, Bestival, V Festival, Secret Garden Party, France's Telerama Dub Festival, Poland's Ostróda Reggae Festival, and Croatia's Outlook Festival. Their records remain within the top 40 of the iTunes store album reggae charts since release, hailing support from some of the UK's most prominent underground representatives including Huw Stephens (BBC Radio 1), Rob Da Bank (BBC Radio 1), David Rodigan (BBC Radio 1Xtra), and Don Letts (BBC Radio 6 Music).

Gentleman's Dub Club have supported a number of established artists such as Roots Manuva, The Streets, The Wailers, Busy Signal, U-Roy, and Finlay Quaye. Their debut album, FOURtyFOUR, was released on 18 October 2013 on Ranking Records.

Their second album The Big Smoke was released in 2015. On 1 February 2017 Gentleman's Dub Club announced their third album, titled Dubtopia, would be released on 7 April. At the same time, the band also launched the Dubtopia tour, starting in Falmouth, Cornwall, UK on 17 February and ending at Festival Insolent in Lanester, France on 22 April.

Discography

Studio albums

References

External links
 Ranking Records - Gentleman's Dub Club
 Official website

English ska musical groups
Dub musical groups
Dubtronica musicians
Musical groups from Leeds
Musical groups established in 2006

Easy Star Records artists